Masud II (Persian: مسعود دوم) or, Masud II of Ghazni (مسعود دوم غزنه) was a Sultan of the Ghaznavid Empire. Masud was the son and successor of Mawdud of Ghazni, and ruled for a short period from (1048 – 1048). He was succeeded by his uncle Ali after his death in 1048.

References 

Ghaznavid rulers
11th-century rulers in Asia
1048 deaths